Coleophora confusa is a moth of the family Coleophoridae. It is found in Asia Minor.

References

confusa
Moths described in 1880
Moths of Asia